In wireless communication, spatial correlation is the correlation between a signal's spatial direction and the average received signal gain.
Theoretically, the performance of wireless communication systems can be improved by having multiple antennas at the transmitter and the receiver. The idea is that if the propagation channels between each pair of transmit and receive antennas are statistically independent and identically distributed, then multiple independent channels with identical characteristics can be created by precoding and be used for either transmitting multiple data streams or increasing the reliability (in terms of bit error rate). In practice, the channels between different antennas are often correlated and therefore the potential multi antenna gains may not always be obtainable.

Existence 

In an ideal communication scenario, there is a line-of-sight path between the transmitter and receiver that represents clear spatial channel characteristics. In urban cellular systems, this is seldom the case as base stations are located on rooftops while many users are located either indoors or at streets far from base stations. Thus, there is a non-line-of-sight multipath propagation channel between base stations and users, describing how the signal is reflected at different obstacles on its way from the transmitter to the receiver. However, the received signal may still have a strong spatial signature in the sense that stronger average signal gains are received from certain spatial directions.

Spatial correlation means that there is a correlation between the received average signal gain and the angle of arrival of a signal.

Rich multipath propagation decreases the spatial correlation by spreading the signal such that multipath components are received from many different spatial directions. Short antenna separations increase the spatial correlation as adjacent antennas will receive similar signal components. The existence of spatial correlation has been experimentally validated.

Spatial correlation is often said to degrade the performance of multi antenna systems and put a limit on the number of antennas that can be effectively squeezed into a small device (as a mobile phone). This seems intuitive as spatial correlation decreases the number of independent channels that can be created by precoding, but is not true for all kinds of channel knowledge as described below.

Mathematical description 

In a narrowband flat-fading channel with  transmit antennas and  receive antennas (MIMO), the propagation channel is modeled as

The  noise vector is denoted . The th element of the  channel matrix  describes the channel from the th transmit antenna to the th receive antenna.

The common formula for the correlation matrix is:

where  denotes vectorization,  denotes expected value and  means Hermitian.

When modeling spatial correlation it is useful to employ the Kronecker model, where the correlation between transmit antennas and receive antennas are assumed independent and separable. This model is reasonable when the main scattering appears close to the antenna arrays and has been validated by both outdoor and indoor measurements.

With Rayleigh fading, the Kronecker model means that the channel matrix can be factorized as

The important part of the model is that   is pre-multiplied by the receive-side spatial correlation matrix  and post-multiplied by transmit-side spatial correlation matrix .

Equivalently, the channel matrix can be expressed as

where  denotes the Kronecker product.

Spatial correlation matrices 

Each eigenvector represents a spatial direction of the channel and its corresponding eigenvalue describes the average channel/signal gain in this direction.

Impact on performance 

This effect can be analyzed mathematically by majorization of vectors with eigenvalues.

In information theory, the ergodic channel capacity represents the amount of information that can be transmitted reliably. Intuitively, the channel capacity is always degraded by receive-side spatial correlation as it decreases the number of (strong) spatial directions that the signal is received from. This makes it harder to perform diversity combining.

The impact of transmit-side spatial correlation depends on the channel knowledge. If the transmitter is perfectly informed or is uninformed, then the more spatial correlation there is the less the channel capacity. However, if the transmitter has statistical knowledge (i.e., knows  and ) it is the other way around – spatial correlation improves the channel capacity since the dominating effect is that the channel uncertainty decreases.

The ergodic channel capacity measures the theoretical performance, but similar results have been proved for more practical performance measures as the error rate.

Sensor measurements
Spatial correlation can have another meaning in the context of sensor data in the context of a variety of applications such as air pollution monitoring. In this context a key characteristic of such applications is that nearby sensor nodes monitoring an environmental feature typically register similar values. This kind of data redundancy due to the spatial correlation between sensor observations inspires the techniques for in-network data aggregation and mining. By measuring the spatial correlation between data sampled by different sensors, a wide class of specialized algorithms can be developed to develop more efficient spatial data mining algorithms as well as more efficient routing strategies.

See also
 MIMO
 Diversity combining
 Multipath propagation
 Precoding
 Spatial multiplexing

References

Wireless
Telecommunication theory